Corinna Kunze (born 7 October 1963) is a German handball player who played for the West German national team. She was born in Dortmund. She represented West Germany at the 1984 Summer Olympics in Los Angeles, where the West German team placed fourth.

References

1963 births
Living people
Sportspeople from Dortmund
German female handball players
Olympic handball players of West Germany
Handball players at the 1984 Summer Olympics
20th-century German women
21st-century German women